Therese Brogårde (born 30 January 1980) is a retired Swedish footballer. Brogårde was part of the Djurgården Swedish champions' team of 2003 and 2004.

Honours

Club 
 Djurgården/Älvsjö 
 Damallsvenskan (2): 2003, 2004

References

Swedish women's footballers
Djurgårdens IF Fotboll (women) players
1980 births
Living people
Women's association footballers not categorized by position